Super Boy or Happy Boy (literally "Happy Boys") was a Chinese singing contest for male contestants. It was organized by Hunan Satellite Television in 2007, as a spin-off of its popular Super Girl series. It's a talent show which aims at uncovering talented tomorrow new male stars.

Outline
Partly inspired by the many spinoffs of the UK show Pop Idol, the competition was open to any male contestant regardless of his origin, appearance, or how he sings. The restricted audition sessions drew contestants over the age of 18. Many applicants travelled long distances to take part in the competition hoping to become the next pop star in China and elsewhere.

Following the selection of contestants in the six regions, the competition began with the preliminary rounds. Preliminaries were held in each of the six locations where auditions were located. Television viewers were able to watch each of the preliminaries and vote for their favorite singers. Voting was conducted by telephone and text messaging.

The regional preliminaries are followed by a weekly broadcast knockout competition held in Changsha, Hunan province. Viewers call in to vote for their favourite singers, and the weakest two—as voted by the judges and the audience's weekly SMS— face-off subsequently in a PK, short for Player Kill. The term is derived from kill-or-be-killed multiplayer online games. The singer with the fewest votes is then eliminated. Unlike Pop Idol, the last event is contested between the final three, rather than the final two contestants.

Unlike American Idol, judges for the competition were selected from different backgrounds in society. A few dozen "audience judges" were selected in addition to several professional judges.

Democratic expression
One of the main factors contributing to the show's popularity was that viewers are able to participate in the judging process by sending text messages with their mobile phones to vote for their favorite contestants. This was, according to Jim Yardley of International Herald Tribune, considered as one of the largest "democratic" voting exercises in mainland China.

Reaction
The contest selected many stars like Chen Chusheng, Jason Zhang, Chen Xiang, Vision Wei, Hua Chenyu and so on. It gives the young boys, who love music, the way to achieve dreams. But it also caused some criticism. Some people think it contributes to the atmosphere of daydream of becoming stars. Many young people change their attention from study to music and singing, without considering whether they have this gift. In sum, it once became a fashion.

Season summary

2007 season
The first season of Super Boy aired from May 25 to July 20, 2007. Although the winners of the competition were not promised recording contracts, the top three winners signed such deals.

Qualifications

Final contest

 Champion
 Challenges succeed to switch rank 
 Eliminated

Final Contestants
 Chen Chusheng (陈楚生) - Champion
 Su Xing (苏醒) - 2nd place
 Vision Wei (魏晨) - 3rd place
 Jason Zhang (张杰) - 4th place
 Ji Jie (吉杰) - 5th place
 Yu Haoming (俞灏明) - 6th place
 Wang Yuexin (王栎鑫) - 7th place
 Amguulan (阿穆隆) - 8th place
 Zhang Yuan (张远) - 9th place
 Wang Zhenglian (王铮亮) - 10th place
 Yao Zhen (姚政) - 11th place
 Guo Biao (郭彪) - 12 place
 Lu Hu (陆虎) - 13th place

2010 season

 Champion
 Weekly cover boy
 Eliminated
 Special contestants

Final contestants
 06. Well Li Wei (李炜) - Fuzhou Area - 1st place - Champion
 09. Liu Xin (刘心) - Changsha Area - 2nd place
 02. Philip [Wuyi] (武艺) - Changsha Area - 3rd place
 11. Jaki Tan Jiexi (谭杰希) - Guangzhou Area - 4th place
 12. Chen Xiang (陈翔) - Chengdu Area - 5th place
 04. Li Hangliang (李行亮) - Guangzhou Area - 6th place
 03. King Wang Ye (王野) - Shenyang Area - 7th place
 13. 8090 - Kuai Le Tian Tuan - 8th place
 10. Zhang Jianbo (张建波) - Hefei Area - 8th place
 07. Wu Junyu (吴俊余) - Chengdu Area - 9th place
 05. Umut 玉米提·帕日哈提 - Changsha Area - 10th place
 01. Delay - Chengdu Area - 11th place
 08. Zhao Fan (赵帆) - Chengdu Area - 12 place

See also
Hunan Satellite Television
Idol series
The Voice of China

References

External links
Hunan TV 2007 Super Boy official site
Hunan TV 2010 Super Boy official site

Singing talent shows
Chinese music television series
Mandopop
2007 Chinese television series debuts
2010 Chinese television series endings
Chinese television shows
Mandarin-language television shows
Hunan Television original programming